Notascea brevispinula is a moth of the  family Notodontidae. It is known only from Rio de Janeiro and Tijaca in Brazil.

External links
discoverlife.org

Notodontidae of South America
Moths described in 2008
Notodontidae